Be'eri  is a kibbutz in southern Israel. Located in the north-western Negev desert near the border with the Gaza Strip, it falls under the jurisdiction of Eshkol Regional Council.

History
Kibbutz Beeri was established on 6 October 1946 as one of the 11 points in the Negev. It was located near Wadi Nahabir, a few kilometres south of Be'erot Yitzhak. Its founders were members of the HaNoar HaOved VeHaLomed movement, who had been preparing in Maoz Haim, as well as some Hebrew scouts. It was named after Berl Katznelson, as Be'eri (Beeri) (a biblical name) was his pen name.

In 1947 Be'eri had a population of over 150. The early settlers engaged in land reclamation and tree planting. The group was enlarged by young Jews from Iraq who arrived by desert trek. The Jewish National Fund reported that for months the kibbutz was completely isolated, "but the settlers held their ground until the liberation of the Negev in October 1948."

After Israeli independence, the kibbutz moved three kilometres southeast to its present location. It is considered  one of Israel's wealthiest kibbutzim. From the Second Intifada, the kibbutz suffered from Qassam rocket attacks and combat near the Israel–Gaza barrier eight kilometres away.

Michele Bachmann was a volunteer at Be'eri in 1974.

Economy
Unlike many kibbutzim that have undergone privatization, Kibbutz Be'eri has retained the old cooperative model. The main source of income is the Be'eri printing company, which has an annual turnover of hundreds of millions of shekels. The company has expanded into package printing, online photo albums and professional marketing material for small businesses. It also owns a food tech company, Hinoman, which cultivates Mankai (Wolffia globosa), a nutrient-rich super-vegetable grown using sustainable hydroponics.

Landmarks
About four kilometers to the north lies the ANZAC Monument, commemorating the ANZAC soldiers who died in the Third Battle of Gaza in World War I.

The Be'eri Forest with the Be'eri Badlands Nature Reserve within.

Sports
The kibbutz's basketball team, Hapoel Be'eri, plays in Liga Leumit.

Historical images

References

External links

Official website 
Be'eri  WiKibbutz 

Kibbutzim
Kibbutz Movement
Populated places established in 1946
Jewish villages in Mandatory Palestine
Populated places in Southern District (Israel)
1946 establishments in Mandatory Palestine